Catocala svetlana is a moth in the family Erebidae. It is found in China (Fujian).

References

svetlana
Moths described in 1997
Moths of Asia